The 80th Academy Awards ceremony, presented by the Academy of Motion Picture Arts and Sciences (AMPAS), honored the best films of 2007. The award ceremony took place on February 24, 2008, at the Kodak Theatre in Hollywood, Los Angeles. During the ceremony, AMPAS presented Academy Awards (commonly referred to as Oscars) in 24 categories. The ceremony was televised in the United States by ABC, and produced by Gil Cates and directed by Louis J. Horvitz. Comedian Jon Stewart hosted the show for the second time, having previously presided over the 78th ceremony held in 2006. On February 9, at the Beverly Wilshire Hotel in Beverly Hills, the Academy Awards for Technical Achievement were presented by host Jessica Alba.

No Country for Old Men won four awards, including Best Picture. Other winners included The Bourne Ultimatum with three awards, La Vie en Rose and There Will Be Blood with two, and Atonement, The Counterfeiters, Elizabeth: The Golden Age, Freeheld, The Golden Compass, Juno, Michael Clayton, Le Mozart des Pickpockets, Once, Peter & the Wolf, Ratatouille, Sweeney Todd: The Demon Barber of Fleet Street, and Taxi to the Dark Side with one. The telecast garnered 31 million viewers, making it the least watched Oscar broadcast since 1974, when Nielsen began keeping records of viewership.

Winners and nominees
The nominations were announced on January 22, 2008, at the Samuel Goldwyn Theater in Beverly Hills, California by Sid Ganis, president of the Academy, and actress Kathy Bates. No Country for Old Men and There Will Be Blood tied for the most nominations with eight each. Cate Blanchett became the eleventh performer to receive two acting nominations in the same year, as well as being the first actress and fifth performer overall to be nominated for portraying the same character in two different films, by virtue of her nomination for her role as Elizabeth I of England in Elizabeth: The Golden Age (she had previously been nominated for playing Elizabeth I in 1998's Elizabeth).<ref>Oscars: 6 Actors Nominated for Playing the Same Character Twice  Other actors nominated for the same character in multiple films were</p>Paul Newman for "Fast Eddie" Felson in The Hustler and The Color of Money;Al Pacino for Michael Corleone in The Godfather and The Godfather Part II;Peter O'Toole for King Henry II in Becket and The Lion in Winter;Bing Crosby for Father O'Malley in Going My Way and The Bells of St. Mary's;and later, Sylvester Stallone for Rocky and Creed</ref> At age 82, Best Supporting Actor nominee Hal Holbrook became the oldest male acting nominee in Oscar history at the time.

Best Director winners Joel and Ethan Coen became the second pair of directors to win the award for the same film, after Jerome Robbins and Robert Wise for West Side Story (1961). This was the second time in Oscar history that none of the four acting winners was American (the first being the 37th Academy Awards). Daniel Day-Lewis became the eighth person to win Best Actor twice, while Best Actress winner Marion Cotillard became the fifth person to win for a non-English language performance and the second Best Actress winner to do so after Sophia Loren (Two Women (1961)).  Robert F. Boyle became the oldest recipient of the Academy Honorary award at the age of 98.

Awards

Winners are listed first, highlighted in boldface, and indicated with a double dagger.

Academy Honorary Award
 Robert F. Boyle  In recognition of one of cinema's great careers in art direction.

Films with multiple nominations and awards

The following 21 films received multiple nominations:

The following four films received multiple awards:

Presenters and performers
The following individuals presented awards or performed musical numbers.

Presenters

Performers

Ceremony information

In September 2007, the Academy hired Gil Cates to oversee production of the telecast for a record 14th time. Ganis explained his decision to hire Cates as producer stating, "He's so talented...so creative and inventive, and so enormously passionate about the Oscars. All of that will again translate into a night that people can't wait to experience." Immediately, Cates selected actor, comedian, and talk-show host Jon Stewart as host of the 2008 ceremony. "Jon was a terrific host for the 78th Awards," Cates said about Stewart in a press release. "He is smart, quick, funny, loves movies and is a great guy. What else could one ask for?"

Furthermore, the 2007–08 Writers Guild of America strike affected the telecast and its surrounding events. Over a month after the labor dispute began, the striking Writers Guild of America (WGA) denied a waiver requested by the Academy of Motion Picture Arts and Sciences in connection with film clips and excerpts from previous award ceremonies to be shown at the 2008 awards. The material could have been used, as the denial only affected the conditions under which the clips are shown. Previously, the 60th ceremony held in 1988 occurred 37 days after that year's writers strike began. At the time, material was already completed in anticipation for the strike, and actors were in full attendance of the ceremony.

In anticipation that the strike would continue through Oscar night, AMPAS developed a Plan B show that would not have included actors accepting their awards. It would have included the musical numbers, but would have relied heavily on historic film clips, emphasizing the 80th anniversary of the awards. However, both the WGA and Alliance of Motion Picture and Television Producers (AMPTP) reached an agreement effectively ending the strike on February 12, 2008, and the ceremony proceeded under its normal format.

Box office performance of nominated films
Continuing a trend in recent years, the field of major nominees favored independent, low-budget films over blockbusters. The combined gross of the five Best Picture nominees when the Oscars were announced was $217 million; the average gross per film was $43.3 million.

None of the five Best Picture nominees was among the top ten releases in box office during the nominations. When the nominations were announced on January 22, Juno was the highest earner among the Best Picture nominees with $87.1 million in domestic box office receipts. The film was followed by No Country for Old Men ($48.9 million), Michael Clayton ($39.4 million), Atonement ($32.7 million), and finally There Will Be Blood ($8.7 million).

Out of the top 50 grossing movies of the year (prior to announcement), 29 nominations went to 12 films on the list. Only Ratatouille (9th), American Gangster (18th), Juno (31st), Charlie Wilson's War (39th), and Surf's Up (41st) received nominations for Best Picture, Best Animated Feature, directing, acting, or screenwriting. The other top-50 box office hits that earned nominations were Transformers (3rd), Pirates of the Caribbean: At World's End (4th), The Bourne Ultimatum (7th), Enchanted (20th), Norbit (29th), The Golden Compass (37th), and 3:10 to Yuma (45th).

Critical reviews
The show received a mixed reception from media publications. Some media outlets were more critical of the show. The Washington Post television critic Tom Shales quipped that the ceremony was "Overstocked with clips from movies -- from this year's nominees and from Oscar winners going back to 1929 -- that it was like a TV show with the hiccups." Columnist James Poniewozik of Time commented that Stewart was "an Oscar host–sometimes a funny one, but a pretty conventional one, whose routine was loaded up with kiss-up softballs about how hot Colin Farrell is, what range Cate Blanchett has and what a tomcat Jack Nicholson is." Of the show itself, he wrote, "What we got instead was a show that half the time seemed like the show the Academy would have put on if there had been a strike, chockful of montages. The other half of the time, it was an typical-to-dull Oscars." Columnist Robert Bianco of USA Today said, "Has it ever felt like more of a padded bore than it did Sunday night? If so, blame the writers' strike, which left the producers with only a few weeks to prepare for the ABC broadcast and persuaded them to lean less on the host and more on old clips." He also observed that numerous film montages seemed to diminish Stewart's job as host.

The majority of other media outlets received the broadcast more positively. Television critic Matthew Gilbert of the Boston Globe gave an average critique of the ceremony but praised Stewart writing that "It was good to see Jon Stewart being Jon Stewart. He is shaping up to be a dependable Oscar host for the post-Billy Crystal years. He's not musical, but he's versatile enough to swing smoothly between jokes about politics, Hollywood, new media, and, most importantly, hair." Variety columnist Brian Lowry lauded Stewart's performance noting that he "earned his keep by maintaining a playful, irreverent tone throughout the night, whether it was jesting about Cate Blanchett's versatility or watching Lawrence of Arabia on an iPhone screen." Frazier Moore from the Associated Press commended Stewart's improvement from his first hosting stint commenting, "He proved equal to the challenge posed by Oscarcast's quick turnaround. His crash-deadline material worked. And even when it didn't, he was genial, relaxed, and seemed utterly at home." In addition, he quipped that although there was a lack of surprise amongst the winners, he marveled "The evening was plenty elegant. The stage setting was handsome. The orchestra sounded full and lush. Everyone behaved."

Ratings and reception
The American telecast on ABC drew in an average of 32 million people over its length, which was a 21% decrease from the previous year's ceremony. An estimated 64 million total viewers watched all or part of the awards. The show also earned lower Nielsen ratings compared to the previous ceremony with 18.7% of households watching over a 29 share. In addition, it garnered a lower 18–49 demo rating with a 10.7 rating over a 26 share among viewers in that demographic. Many media outlets pointed out that the Writers Guild strike and the niche popularity amongst the field of major nominees contributed to the low ratings. It earned the lowest viewership for an Academy Award telecast since figures were compiled beginning with the 46th ceremony in 1974.

In July 2008, the ceremony presentation received nine nominations at the 60th Primetime Emmy Awards. Two months later, the ceremony won two of those nominations for Outstanding Art Direction (Roy Christopher and Joe Celli) and Outstanding Directing for a Variety, Music, or Comedy Program (Louis J. Horvitz).

In Memoriam
The annual In Memoriam tribute, presented by actress Hilary Swank, honored the following people:

 Roscoe Lee Browne - Actor
 Barry Nelson - Actor
 Kitty Carlisle Hart - Actress, TV personality
 Betty Hutton - Actress
 Calvin Lockhart - Actor
 Jane Wyman - Actress
 Melville Shavelson – Writer
 Curtis Harrington – Director
 Jack Valenti – Executive
 Michael Kidd – Dancer
 Michelangelo Antonioni – Director
 Delbert Mann – Director
 Monty Westmore – Makeup artist
 Peter T. Hanford – Sound
 Bud Ekins – Stuntman
 Bernard Gordon – Writer
 Dabbs Greer - Actor
 Jean-Claude Brialy - Actor
 Harold Michelson – Art director
 Laraine Day - Actress
 Jean-Pierre Cassel - Actor
 Lois Maxwell - Actress
 Laszlo Kovacs – Cinematographer
 Robert Clark – Director 
 George Jenkins – Art director
 Johnny Grant – Executive
 Frank Rosenfelt – Executive
 Martin Manulis – Producer
 Donfeld – Costume designer
 Ousmane Sembène – Director
 Freddy Fields – Agent
 Robert Lantz – Agent
 Ray Kurtzman – Executive
 Miyoshi Umeki - Singer, actress
 Suzanne Pleshette - Actress
 Deborah Kerr - Actress
 Peter Ellenshaw – Visual effects
 Peter Zinner – Film editor
 Freddie Francis – Cinematographer
 Ingmar Bergman – Director
 Ray Evans – Music
 William Tuttle – Makeup
 Heath Ledger - Actor

See also
 14th Screen Actors Guild Awards
 28th Golden Raspberry Awards
 50th Grammy Awards
 60th Primetime Emmy Awards
 61st British Academy Film Awards
 62nd Tony Awards
 65th Golden Globe Awards
 List of submissions to the 80th Academy Awards for Best Foreign Language Film

Notes

References

Bibliography

External links

Official websites
 Academy Awards Official website
 The Academy of Motion Picture Arts and Sciences Official website
 Oscar's Channel at YouTube (run by the Academy of Motion Picture Arts and Sciences)

Analysis
 2007 Academy Awards Winners and History Filmsite
 Academy Awards, USA: 2008 Internet Movie Database

News resources
 Oscars 2008 BBC News
 80th Academy Awards Boston.com
 Academy Awards coverage CNN
 Oscars 2008 The Guardian

Other resources
 

Academy Awards ceremonies
2007 film awards
2008 awards in the United States
2008 in Los Angeles
2008 in American cinema
February 2008 events in the United States
Television shows directed by Louis J. Horvitz